is a Japanese football player. She plays for JEF United Chiba. She played for Japan national team.

Club career
Otaki was born in Hiratsuka on July 28, 1989. After graduating from Waseda University, she joined French Division 1 club Olympique Lyonnais in 2012. The club won 2011–12 UEFA Champions League. In June 2013, she returned to Japan and joined Urawa Reds. In December 2014, she moved to the French club En Avant Guingamp. In May 2015, she retired end of 2014–15 season. In 2016, Otaki took a year away from football to participate in the 17th edition of the FIFA Master. She graduated in July 2017 and later that month signed a one-year contract with Paris FC. In January 2018, she returned to Japan and joined NHK Spring Yokohama FC Seagulls. In 2019, she moved to JEF United Chiba.

National team career
On June 20, 2012, Otaki debuted for Japan national team against Sweden. She played 3 games for Japan until 2013.

Club statistics

National team statistics

References

External links

  Amo Otaki at Footofeminin.fr

1989 births
Living people
Waseda University alumni
Association football people from Kanagawa Prefecture
People from Hiratsuka, Kanagawa
Japanese women's footballers
Japan women's international footballers
Nadeshiko League players
Olympique Lyonnais Féminin players
Urawa Red Diamonds Ladies players
Nippatsu Yokohama FC Seagulls players
JEF United Chiba Ladies players
Japanese expatriates in France
Expatriate women's footballers in France
Women's association football forwards
FIFA Master alumni
Division 1 Féminine players
Universiade silver medalists for Japan
Universiade medalists in football
Medalists at the 2009 Summer Universiade
Medalists at the 2011 Summer Universiade